José de Figueroa y Alonso-Martínez (24 December 1897 – 20 October 1920) was a Spanish equestrian who was part of the silver-medal winning Spanish men's polo team in the 1920 Summer Olympics. He was killed in action during the Rif War soon after his Olympic appearance. He was the son of Álvaro de Figueroa, who was Prime Minister of Spain.

References

1897 births
1920 deaths
Sportspeople from Madrid
Spanish polo players
Olympic polo players of Spain
Spanish military personnel of the Rif War
Spanish military personnel killed in action
Polo players at the 1920 Summer Olympics
Olympic medalists in polo
Olympic silver medalists for Spain
Medalists at the 1920 Summer Olympics